Dilling Airport  is an airport serving Dilling (Dalang) in Sudan.

See also
Transport in Sudan
List of airports in Sudan

References

External links
OpenStreetMap - Dilling Airport
 OurAirports - Dilling
 FallingRain - Dilling Airport

 Google Earth

Airports in Sudan